Live on Earth is the first full-length live album released by Melbourne band The Cat Empire. (The band had previously released an EP disc titled Live @ Adelphia).  
   
The album is a compilation of tracks recorded at shows between August 2006 and December 2008. It included songs recorded at venues in Australia, France, the UK, the US and Canada. The album was originally scheduled to be released on 28 February 2009 in Australia, but was officially released a week earlier (though many retailers released the album days before the 21st.)

Live on Earth was available with a signed album cover via online pre-order.

The first single from the album, "How to Explain?", was released on the iTunes Store on 13 February 2009.  The album also 
features a French-language cover version of the Eagles song "Hotel California" recorded in Montreal, Canada.

Track listing

Live at the Bowl
A 2-disc DVD was also released the same time as Live on Earth entitled Live at the Bowl. The first disc contains footage of their entire concert at Sidney Myer Music Bowl. The second disc contains a 'backstage pass' with moments from their recent overseas tour captured on Ryan's camera. It also contains videos from their first concert as a six piece in 2001, 3 tracks from Triple J's AWOL in 2007 at Burnie, Tasmania, and 2 tracks from their performance with the Australian Youth Orchestra in 2008.

Track listing
Sunny Moon
So Many Nights
Til the Ocean Takes Us All
The Rhythm
In My Pocket
Sly
No Longer There
Two Shoes
The Wine Song
Fishies
The Darkness
The Chariot

Charts

Certifications

References

External links
 The Cat Empire Home Page

The Cat Empire albums
2009 live albums
2009 video albums
Live video albums